Charles Wilkins (born 1938) is an American chemist who is a distinguished professor of chemistry and biochemistry at the University of Arkansas and the founding director of the University of Arkansas Statewide Mass Spectrometry Facility.

Early life and education
Wilkins was born in California. He earned a Bachelor of Science degree from Chapman College and a PhD from the University of Oregon.

Career
Wilkins was a distinguished professor of chemistry at the University of California, Riverside and a chemistry professor at the University of Nebraska–Lincoln. In 1993, Wilkins was a recipient of the Tolman Award.

With Michael Gross, he built the second Fourier transform ion cyclotron resonance mass spectrometer and they were the first to use it for analytical applications. In November 2020, Wilkins was selected as the chief editor of the International Journal of Analytical Chemistry.

References

1938 births
American chemists
American biochemists
Living people
University of Oregon alumni
University of Arkansas faculty
University of California, Riverside faculty
University of Nebraska faculty